The Blackburn F3 (also called the Blackburn F.7/30) was a British single-engined fighter aircraft produced in response to Air Ministry Specification F.7/30.

Design and development
Following the release of Air Ministry Specification F.7/30 for a single-seat day and night fighter, eight companies proposed twelve designs and three, including Blackburn Aircraft, received contracts to produce a prototype. Blackburn's design, the F.3, was a single-bay biplane of unequal wingspan and with an unusual configuration, the upper wing being mounted approximately halfway up the stressed-skin fuselage and the lower wing about two feet below it, the gap being occupied by an enclosure for the condenser of the evaporatively-cooled Goshawk III engine. The undercarriage was attached to the front spar of the lower wing, with diagonal struts transmitting the landing loads to the fuselage longerons. The wheels were fitted with spats but these were later removed. Four Vickers machine-guns were fuselage mounted, two in mid-position on the fuselage and the other two on either side of the top of the condenser housing.

Operational history
Taxiing trials of the F.3 began on 20 July 1934 but  the combination of a short fuselage and a high centre of gravity made it difficult to manoeuvre on the ground and the engine suffered from cooling problems. Further development was stopped when, after an inspection revealed damage to the rear fuselage resulting from the taxiing trials, the Air Ministry withdrew support for the project since the aircraft would have been too delayed to take part in the trials. Following evaluation of F.7/30 designs an order was placed for the Gloster Gladiator.

Specifications

See also

Notes

References

External links
 A photograph of the Blackburn F.3 K2892

1930s British fighter aircraft
F.3
Cancelled military aircraft projects of the United Kingdom
Single-engined tractor aircraft
Biplanes